Downpatrick was a United Kingdom Parliament constituency in Ireland, returning one MP. It was an original constituency represented in Parliament when the Union of Great Britain and Ireland took effect on 1 January 1801.

Boundaries
This constituency was the parliamentary borough of Downpatrick in County Down.

Members of Parliament

Supplemental notes
 Stooks Smith suggests that after the 1806 election there was a petition, which led to Edward Southwell Ruthven (Whig) being unseated and John Wilson Croker {Tory} being declared duly elected. Walker does not make any reference to such a petition.
 Walker (like F. W. S. Craig in his compilations of election results for Great Britain) classifies Tory candidates as Conservatives from 1832. The name Conservative was gradually adopted as a description for the Tories. The party is deemed to be named Conservative from the 1835 general election.
 Walker (like F. W. S. Craig in his compilations of election results for Great Britain) classifies Whig, Radical and similar candidates as Liberals from 1832. The name Liberal was gradually adopted as a description for the Whigs and politicians allied with them, before the formal creation of the Liberal Party shortly after the 1859 general election.

Elections

Elections in the 1830s

Elections in the 1840s

Elections in the 1850s
Ker resigned by accepting the office of Steward of the Chiltern Hundreds, causing a by-election.

Hardinge succeeded to the peerage, becoming 2nd Viscount Hardinge and causing a by-election.

Elections in the 1860s

Ker resigned, causing a by-election.

Elections in the 1870s

Elections in the 1880s

References

The Parliaments of England by Henry Stooks Smith (1st edition published in three volumes 1844–50), 2nd edition edited (in one volume) by F.W.S. Craig (Political Reference Publications 1973)

Westminster constituencies in County Down (historic)
Constituencies of the Parliament of the United Kingdom established in 1801
Constituencies of the Parliament of the United Kingdom disestablished in 1885
Downpatrick